Sphaerisporangium is a Gram-positive genus of bacteria from the family of Streptosporangiaceae.

References

Further reading 
 
 </ref>
 
 
 

 

Micrococcales
Bacteria genera